The 2022 Poker Masters was the seventh season of the Poker Masters. It took place from September 21 to October 3, 2022, from the PokerGO Studio at ARIA Resort & Casino in Las Vegas, Nevada. There were 10 events on the schedule including nine No-Limit Hold'em, two Pot-Limit Omaha, and one 8-Game event. Buy-ins ranged from $10,000 to the $50,000 Main Event. Final tables were streamed on PokerGO.

Sean Winter cashed twice including winning Event #9 to earn the Purple Jacket as the series champion.

Schedule 
The schedule for the 2022 Poker Masters included seven No-Limit Hold'em tournaments, two Pot-Limit Omaha tournaments, and an 8-Game event. 8-Game is a rotation of H.O.R.S.E., No-Limit Hold'em, Pot-Limit Omaha, and 2-7 Triple Draw.

Purple Jacket standings 
The 2022 Poker Masters awarded the Purple Jacket and a $50,000 championship bonus to the player that accumulated the most PokerGO Tour points during the series.

Results

Event #1: $10,000 No-Limit Hold'em 

 2-Day Event: September 21-22, 2022
 Number of Entrants: 85
 Total Prize Pool: $850,000
 Number of Payouts: 13
 Winning Hand:

Event #2: $10,000 No-Limit Hold'em 

 2-Day Event: September 22-23, 2022
 Number of Entrants: 76
 Total Prize Pool: $760,000
 Number of Payouts: 11
 Winning Hand:

Event #3: $10,000 Pot-Limit Omaha 

 2-Day Event: September 23-24, 2022
 Number of Entrants: 81
 Total Prize Pool: $810,000
 Number of Payouts: 12
 Winning Hand:

Event #4: $10,000 No-Limit Hold'em 

 2-Day Event: September 24-26, 2022
 Number of Entrants: 74
 Total Prize Pool: $740,000
 Number of Payouts: 11
 Winning Hand:

Event #5: $10,000 8-Game 

 2-Day Event: September 26-27, 2022
 Number of Entrants: 62
 Total Prize Pool: $620,000
 Number of Payouts: 9
 Winning Hand:

Event #6: $10,000 No-Limit Hold'em 

 2-Day Event: September 27-28, 2022
 Number of Entrants: 97
 Total Prize Pool: $970,000
 Number of Payouts: 14
 Winning Hand:

Event #7: $25,000 No-Limit Hold'em 

 2-Day Event: September 28-29, 2022
 Number of Entrants: 69
 Total Prize Pool: $1,725,000
 Number of Payouts: 10
 Winning Hand:

Event #8: $25,000 Pot-Limit Omaha 

 2-Day Event: September 29-30, 2022
 Number of Entrants: 40
 Total Prize Pool: $1,000,000
 Number of Payouts: 6
 Winning Hand:

Event #9: $25,000 No-Limit Hold'em 

 2-Day Event: September 30-October 1, 2022
 Number of Entrants: 54
 Total Prize Pool: $1,350,000
 Number of Payouts: 8
 Winning Hand:

Event #10: $50,000 No-Limit Hold'em 

 2-Day Event: October 1-3, 2022
 Number of Entrants: 37
 Total Prize Pool: $1,850,000
 Number of Payouts: 6
 Winning Hand:

References

External links 

 Results

Poker tournaments
Television shows about poker
2022 in poker
2022 in sports in Nevada